Kalodont was a toothpaste brand produced by F. A. Sarg's Sohn & Co. from Vienna, first sold in Austria-Hungary in 1887. It later became widely distributed, in 34 other countries, and obtained a near-monopoly status that caused the word "kalodont" to become synonymous with the word for "tooth paste" in South Slavic languages. Kalodont ceased to be produced in 1981, but returned on the market in 2012. It was also advertised and sold in Russia in 1927.

See also

List of toothpaste brands
Index of oral health and dental articles
 List of defunct consumer brands

References

1887 introductions
1981 disestablishments
Brands of toothpaste
Oral hygiene